Galgo Jr. (March 17 1928 – December 21, 1936) was a champion Thoroughbred racehorse that was raised and raced in Puerto Rico notable for being one of the first champions of Puerto Rico and at for being the former record holder for most wins by a racehorse and joined former record holder for most wins in a single season with Jorrocks.

Background 
Galgo Jr. was a bay colt named after his father Galgo, who himself was named after the Spanish word for Greyhound, effectively making Galgo Jr.'s name in English Greyhound Jr. Although most of his pedigree was nothing special, his grandsire was Fair Play, who was the father of the legendary Man O War.

Racing career 
Galgo Jr. was born on Vieques Island and both of his parents were imported from America. Throughout his career, he would only ever race at two racetracks in Puerto Rico. Quintana Hippodrome and Las Monjas Hippodrome. He would never try to prove himself at the international level helping him easily rack up victories without much challenge. His first race would be on July 17th 1930 in the Clásico Luis Muñoz Rivera it would also be his first victory. In the race, he would set a stakes record running the 6-furlong race in 1:19.00 Although it seems slow, at the time the record was hard to break. Taking 9 years till Sirena broke it with a 1:18.60. He was easily able to rack up 21 wins by the end of his 2-year-old season and he only amassed a single defeat. But his 3-year-old season was by far his best season He was even able to take the second jewel of the Puerto Rican triple crown the Governor's Cup. At his peak he had won 39 straight races, which at the time was an all-time record. However, in the latter half of the 1930s Cofresi reset the record with 49 straight victories. Condado would also break Galgo Jr's record with 43 straight victories. However, in 1931 he also set a joint record for most wins in a single season. Sharing this record with the Australian Iron Gelding Jorrocks. Although other horses like Chorsibar, Yaucano and Lenoxbar would surpass this record. Just like in his two-year-old season Galgo Jr only lost a single time by the end of his three-year-old season he had raced 63 times and had won 61 of them. 

Although he never reached the same heights again he would continue his success until 1936. He would come close to equalling his 30 win season at the age of seven when he managed to reach 25 wins. He also would establish other smaller winning streaks such as a 15 race, 13 race (twice), and 10 race winning streaks over the course of his career. He would also either set or equal a total of 16 track records at Quintana Hippodrome and Las Monjas Hippodrome that would range from  furlongs to 9 furlongs. Sometimes even breaking and resetting the his own records.  Although none of these records currently stand today. Despite this it he was still a versatile runner he could do it all he could sprint, run at a mile and even further. By the end of his 6-year-old season he became the first horse in history to break 100 career wins. Since him only seven other horses have ever broken 100 victories and only three have won more races than Galgo Jr, Chorisbar, Condado, and Yaucano.

Later career and death 
Galgo Jr. raced well into his 8-year-old season continuing to rack up wins and build his world record. By the end of the year he racked up 9 victories, only had lost twice and did not have plans of retirement. However one faithful day on December 21, 1936 while he was in his training box at Las Monjas Hippodrome he collapsed and died of a heart attack. By then he had raced 158 times won 136 of them with 17-second place finishes 1 third 2 fourths and one race where he finished off the board. He earned a $31,738 on the track which at the time was a record however just like his track records this record didn't last. Despite such a quick and abrupt end to his career Galgo Jr. was still a local hero in Puerto Rico and in 1958 he was honored as one of six inaugural inductee racehorses to be inducted into the Puerto Rico Racing Hall Of Fame. Alongside Cameraro,Yaucono,Perla Fina,Condado,and Bachiller.

Pedigree

References 

Puerto Rican racehorses
Individual male horses
1928 racehorse births
1936 racehorse deaths
Racehorses bred in Puerto Rico
Racehorses trained in Puerto Rico